PS Sandeq (previously known as PS Polmas) is an Indonesian football team based in Polewali Mandar Regency, West Sulawesi. They currently competes in Liga 3.

Honours
 Liga 3 West Sulawesi
 Champions: 2019, 2021
 Habibie Cup
 Winners: 1994, 1998, 2000, 2007

References

External links
 

Football clubs in Indonesia
Football clubs in West Sulawesi
Association football clubs established in 1960
1960 establishments in Indonesia